Hoplocorypha lacualis is a species of praying mantis found in Somalia, Tanzania and the Congo River region.

See also
List of mantis genera and species

References

Hoplocorypha
Mantodea of Africa
Insects described in 1916